Anthony James Brien (born 10 February 1969) is an Irish former footballer who played in the Football League for Leicester City, Chesterfield, Rotherham United, West Bromwich Albion, Mansfield Town, Chester City and Hull City.

In January 2017, amid the United Kingdom football sexual abuse scandal, Brien alleged abuse by former Leicester City scout Ted Langford in the 1980s; more detail emerged in September 2017, implicating former Aston Villa manager Graham Taylor in a cover-up of the abuse.

References

External links
Tony Brien player profile at chesterfieldfc.com
Tony Brien info at http://cfchistory.webs.com/tony-brien

1969 births
Living people
Republic of Ireland association footballers
Association football defenders
Chester City F.C. players
Chesterfield F.C. players
Hull City A.F.C. players
Leicester City F.C. players
Rotherham United F.C. players
Mansfield Town F.C. players
West Bromwich Albion F.C. players
Stalybridge Celtic F.C. players
English Football League players